Predict may refer to:

 to predict, the act of prediction
PREDICT (USAID), a US government program to identify new viruses.
PREDICT (U.S. DHS), a U.S. cybersecurity government database of the United States Department of Homeland Security
FT Predict, a market prediction contest established by the Financial Times

See also

 I Predict (1982 song) new wave song by Sparks off the album Angst in My Pants
 I Predict 1990 (1987 album), album by Steve Taylor
 Predictor (disambiguation)
 Predictable (disambiguation)